Designed by Vannevar Bush after he became director of the Carnegie Institution for Science in Washington DC, the Rockefeller Differential Analyzer (RDA) was an all-electronic version of the Differential Analyzer, which Bush had built at the Massachusetts Institute of Technology between 1928 and 1931.

The RDA was operational in 1942, a year after the Zuse Z3. It was equipped with 2000 vacuum tubes, weight 100 tons, used 200 miles of wire, 150 motors and thousand of relays. According to historian Robin Boast, "the RDA (Rockefeller Differential Analyzer) was revolutionary, and later was considered to be one of the most important calculating machines of the Second World War."

References 

 http://www.eecs.mit.edu/AY95-96/events/bush/photos.html
 http://www.vikingwaters.com/htmlpages/MFHistory.htm
 http://www.meccano.us/differential_analyzers/other_da/index.html

Early computers